Canoe surfing may refer to:
 Surf ski
 Whitewater canoeing
 Surf Kayaking
 Outrigger Canoe Surfing